Partial general elections were held in Luxembourg on 7 June 1931, electing 25 of the 54 seats in the Chamber of Deputies in the centre and north of the country, as well as two seats in the south. The Party of the Right won 14 of the 27 seats, and saw its total number of seats rise from 24 to 26.

Results

By constituency

References

Chamber of Deputies (Luxembourg) elections
Legislative election, 1931
Luxembourg
General
Luxembourg
Election and referendum articles with incomplete results